The 3rd Regiment California Volunteer Infantry was an infantry regiment in the Union Army during the American Civil War.  This regiment was organized at Stockton and at Benicia Barracks, from October 31 to December 31, 1861, to serve three years. The regiment was first commanded by Colonel Patrick Edward Connor. After the formation of the regiment at Stockton, four companies were sent to Humboldt County during the month of November, 1861.  During the month of July, 1862, Colonel Connor was sent, with his regiment, to the District of Utah, in which it was on duty for the balance of its term of service.

It spent its entire term of service in the western United States. Its largest engagement was the Bear River Massacre or Battle of Bear River on January 29, 1863, in southeastern Washington Territory (present-day Franklin County, Idaho).

On the expiration of its term of service, the original members of the regiment (except veterans) were mustered out, and the veterans and new recruits were consolidated into a battalion of four companies on October 29, 1864, and was afterwards known as the Third Battalion of Infantry, comprising companies, A, B, C, and D. On December 9, 1865, Companies C and D were consolidated, leaving only three companies in the battalion. The battalion was finally mustered out July 27, 1866.

3rd Regiment of California Volunteer Infantry Commanders
 Colonel Patrick Edward Connor October 31, 1861 - March 30, 1863.
 Colonel Robert Pollock March 30, 1863 - November 14, 1864.

3rd Battalion of Infantry Commanders
 Lt. Colonel Jeramiah B. Moore November 14, 1864 - December 21, 1864.
 Lt. Colonel William M. Johns April 6, 1865 - July 27, 1866.

Company assignments
 Headquarters, was stationed in Stockton from the date of organization to December, 1861, when it was moved to Benicia Barracks, where it remained until June, 1862. During July 1862 it was en route to Fort Ruby, Nevada, where it arrived August 1, 1862.   Early in January 1863 it was at Camp Douglas, where it remained until it finally mustered out, July 27, 1866.
 Company A, was organized at Stockton, October 31, 1861, and went to Benicia Barracks in December, 1861. It went to Fort Baker, in Humboldt County, California, during the month of December, 1861.
 On April 6, 1862, Captain Ketcham, with a scouting party of Company A, found the rancheria of the Indians that had previously robbed Cooper's Mills of two thousand five hundred pounds of flour near Yager Creek.  The Indians had just fled, leaving seven hundred pounds of the flour, together with belting from the mill, mill files, baskets, bullets, lead, shot pouches, bullet molds, etc., all of which were burned, there being no means of packing them.
 On the April 27, Captain Ketcham, of Company A, returned to Fort Baker from a scout to the southward of Van Dusen Fork, with twenty-four Indian prisoners, all women and children, except two young men. In attacking the rancheria four Indians were killed, including a woman, shot by mistake. During the scout Captain Ketcham came upon a rancheria which had been fortified by piles of logs around it, but which the Indians had deserted.
 On the same day Lieutenant Staples, with a detachment of the same company, came upon a large band of Indians by surprise (having previously managed to kill their scout or sentinel without giving alarm); killed fifteen of them and took forty prisoners, three of whom he left behind, being unable to travel.
 On May 7, Captain Ketcham reported eleven Indians came in at Fort Baker, eight men and three women. He sent out two of them as runners to bring in as many more as possible, assuring them of protection.
During July and August, 1862, Company A was en route to Salt Lake City. July 10 it was at Camp Halleck, near Stockton; July 31 at Carson City, Nevada. September 30 at Fort Ruby, Nevada; in February and March, 1863, at Fort Churchill, Nevada, and in January, 1864, at Camp Douglas, where it was stationed until June, 1865. It then went to Denver, Colorado, where it remained until October 1865, when it returned to Camp Douglas, where it was finally mustered out, July 27, 1866.
 Company B, Was organized at Stockton, October 31, 1861. It went to Fort Seward, in Humboldt County, California, during the month of December, 1861.  July 10, 1862, it was at Camp Halleck, near Stockton. From February to June, 1863, it was at Camp Union, near Sacramento.  June 30, 1863, it was at Fort Churchill, Nevada.  During the July 1863 it went to Fort Ruby, Nevada, where it remained until October, 1864.  It returned to Camp Union, California, where the original members, whose terms of service had expired, were mustered out.  The company was then filled up, reorganized, and sent back to Camp Douglas, where it remained from November, 1864, to June, 1865. It then went to Denver, Colorado, where it remained until October 1865, when it returned to Camp Douglas, and was stationed there until its final muster out, July 27, 1866.
 Company C, was organized at Benicia, December 31, 1861. It immediately went to Fort Bragg, California, where it remained until the spring of 1862. Then it went to Fort Ruby, Nevada, where it remained until August or September, 1863 when it moved to Camp Douglas. It was at the latter post until October, 1864. It then went to Camp Connor, in Idaho Territory, returning to Camp Douglas in May, 1865, and remained there until its final muster out, July 27, 1S66.
 Company D, was organized at Stockton, October 31, 1861, and took station at Fort Gaston, Humboldt County.  In the spring of 1862 it returned, and was stationed at Camp Union until the summer of 1863.  It then went to Camp Douglas, Utah, where it remained until its consolidation with Company C, on December 9, 1865.
 Company E, was organized at Benicia, December 21, 1861.  During the summer of 1862 it went to Nevada and Utah, and was stationed at Camp Douglas and Fort Ruby until its disbandment by consolidation, November 1, 1864.
 Company F, was organized at Benicia, on December 12, 1861.  It went to Fort Ruby, Nevada, in the summer of 1862. In the spring of 1864 it marched to Camp Douglas, where it remained until it was disbanded by consolidation, November 1, 1864.
 Company G, was organized at Benicia Barracks, on December 9, 1861. It remained at Benicia until the spring of 1862. It then marched to Camp Douglas, Utah, where it was stationed until it was disbanded by consolidation, November 1, 1864.
 Company H, was organized at Benicia Barracks, December 12, 1861. During the spring or summer of 1862 it went to Utah, and took station at Camp Douglas. In May, 1863, it was at Camp Connor, Idaho, where it remained until it was disbanded by consolidation, at Camp Douglas, November 1, 1864.
 Company I, was organized at Stockton, November 26, 1861.  During the month of December it was moved to Benicia Barracks, where it remained until the summer of 1862, when it went to Fort Bridger, Wyoming (then part of Utah), remaining there until August, 1864, when it marched to Camp Douglas, where it was disbanded by consolidation, November 1, 1864.
 Company K, was organized at Stockton, December 3, 1861. It moved to Benicia Barracks in the same month, and went to Utah, with the balance of the regiment, during the summer of 1862, and was stationed at Camp Douglas during the remainder of its term of service.  It took part in the Battle of Bear River, in January, 1863.  It was disbanded by consolidation, November 1, 1864.

See also
List of California Civil War Union units

References

The Civil War Archive, Union Regimental Index, California
  The War of the Rebellion: Volume 35, Part 1 CORRESPONDENCE, ORDERS, AND RETURNS RELATING TO OPERATIONS ON THE PACIFIC COAST FROM JULY 1, 1862, TO JUNE 30, 1865. By United States. War Dept, Robert Nicholson Scott, Henry Martyn WASHINGTON: GOVERNMENT PRINTING OFFICE. 1897
  Records of California men in the war of the rebellion 1861 to 1867, California. Adjutant General's Office, State Office, J. D. Young, Supt. State Printing, SACRAMENTO, 1890. pp. 505 - 594

External links
The Civil War Archive, Union Regimental Index, California

Units and formations of the Union Army from California
Military units and formations of the United States in the Indian Wars
Military units and formations established in 1861
1861 establishments in California
Military units and formations disestablished in 1866